Robbie Hood is an atmospheric scientist who studies hurricanes. She was lead scientist for the Convection and Moisture Experiment at NASA.

References 

American atmospheric scientists
NASA people
Year of birth missing (living people)
Living people